Tom Bischof (born 28 June 2005) is a German footballer who plays as a midfielder for Bundesliga club 1899 Hoffenheim.

Club career
Bischof made his professional debut for 1899 Hoffenheim in the Bundesliga on 19 March 2022 in the away match against Hertha BSC.

International career
Bischof has played internationally for Germany at under-16 and under-17 levels.

References

External links
 
 

2005 births
Living people
People from Aschaffenburg
Sportspeople from Lower Franconia
Footballers from Bavaria
German footballers
Germany youth international footballers
Association football midfielders
Bundesliga players
TSG 1899 Hoffenheim players